("forested sites") is a term which has been used since the early thirteenth century to refer to the  (singular: , "sites"), or later Ort (plural: , "place") or  (plural: , "estate") of the early confederate allies of Uri, Schwyz and Unterwalden in today's Central Switzerland.

From the 13th to 19th centuries, the term  also synoptically referred to the nucleus of the Swiss Confederacy of Uri, Schwyz and Unterwalden; later, the term was gradually replaced by the term .

History

The first recorded use of the term specifically as referring to the wooded valleys of Central Switzerland is in a document dated 1289, mentioning  (i.e. "in Schwyz, in the wooded site").

In 1323, Glarus is named a  alongside Schwyz. The application to the allies of the early Swiss Confederacy dates to 1309.

With the establishment of the Confederacy in the 1310s, the term is adopted as an exonym, and in the pacts which expanded the Confederacy, with Lucerne in 1332 and with Berne in 1353.

The inclusion of Lucerne as a "fourth"  is first mentioned in an addition dated to the 1450s in the Silver Book of Egloff Etterlin.
 
In the protocols of the Swiss Diet in the second half of the 15th century, under the presidency of Lucerne, the term vier waltstette sees frequent use. Albrecht von Bonstetten in his  (1479) suggests that the term  (latinized ) was in common use.

See also
 Formation of the Old Swiss Confederacy
 Federal Charter of 1291
 
 
 
 Canton of Waldstätten

References

Old Swiss Confederacy